Kela (also Romanized as Kelā and Kalā) is a village in Qohab-e Rastaq Rural District, Amirabad District, Damghan County, Semnan Province, Iran. At the 2006 census, its population was 127, in 41 families.

References 

Populated places in Damghan County